Guestwick railway station is a former station in Norfolk, England. It was constructed by the Midland and Great Northern Joint Railway in 1882 on the line between Melton Constable and Norwich City. It was closed in 1959. It served the village of Guestwick. It is on the path of Marriott's Way which follows the route of the old line.

References

External links
 Guestwick station on navigable 1946 O. S. map
 

Disused railway stations in Norfolk
Former Midland and Great Northern Joint Railway stations
Railway stations in Great Britain opened in 1882
Railway stations in Great Britain closed in 1959